Ask Me Anything may refer to:
 Ask Me Anything (film), 2014
 Ask Me Anything (album), 2015, by Jamie McDell
 "Ask Me Anything", a song by the Strokes on their album First Impressions of Earth
 Ask Me Anything (AMA), a common post topic in the /r/IAmA subreddit of Reddit
 Angela Scanlon's Ask Me Anything, an RTE programme in Ireland